Lester Williams (January 19, 1959 – August 16, 2017) was an American football defensive tackle in the National Football League (NFL), mainly for the New England Patriots, including the team's first Super Bowl appearance. He finished his career with the San Diego Chargers in 1986 and the Seattle Seahawks in 1987.

Williams was born in Miami, Florida. He attended Carol City High School. He was an All-American at the University of Miami in 1981. He was drafted in the first round (27th overall pick) of the 1982 NFL Draft. Williams was added to the school's Sports Hall of Fame in 1999.

He died at his home in Birmingham, Alabama on August 16, 2017 at age 58.

References

1959 births
2017 deaths
Miami Carol City Senior High School alumni
American football defensive tackles
Miami Hurricanes football players
New England Patriots players
San Diego Chargers players
Seattle Seahawks players
Players of American football from Miami
National Football League replacement players